Prior is a surname. Notable people with the surname include:

 Alex Prior (born 1992), Russian child prodigy composer
 Anthony Prior (born 1970), American football player
 Arthur Prior (1914–1969), philosopher and logician
 David Prior (disambiguation), multiple people 
 George Thurland Prior (1862–1936), British mineralogist
 James Prior, Baron Prior (1927–2016), British politician
 John Prior (musician) (born 1960), Australian musician
 Maddy Prior (born 1947), English singer
 Margaret Prior (1773–1842), American humanitarian, missionary, moral reform worker, writer
 Marina Prior (born 1963), Australian singer and actress
 Mark Prior (born 1980), baseball pitcher
 Mary Prior (born 1942), British Lord–Lieutenant for Bristol
 Matthew Prior (1664–1721), English poet
 Matt Prior (born 1982), English cricketer
 Redvers Prior (1893–1964), British politician and Royal Navy officer
 Richard Chandler Alexander Prior (1892–1902), English physician and botanist
 Spencer Prior (born 1971), English footballer

See also
 Preyer
 Pryor (disambiguation)

English-language surnames